The Danube-Iller Regional S-Bahn (Regio-S-Bahn Donau-Iller) is a "regional" S-Bahn system in the Ulm and Neu-Ulm area. It operates Regionalbahn services on electrified and non-electrified lines. Its core is Ulm Hauptbahnhof, which acts as a hub between the regional S-Bahn (RS) lines, other regional services and long-distance services. In December 2020, the first two RS lines from Ulm to Memmingen (RS 7) and Weißenhorn (RS 71) were put into operation in the Bavarian part of the Danube-Iller planning region (Region Donau-Iller). When the 2021/2022 timetable changed, three more lines followed in the Württemberg part of the region on the southern railway to Biberach (RS 2 and RS 21), on the Danube line to Munderkingen (RS 3) and on the Brenz Railway to Aalen (RS 5 and RS 51). Further lines are to be added in the following years. The network is expected to be completed by 2030.

The Danube-Iller Regional S-Bahn is administered by the Donau-Iller-Nahverkehrsverbund GmbH (DING, "Danube-Iller local transport association") and two neighbouring transport associations, the Heidenheimer Tarifverbund ("Heidenheim tariff association") and OstalbMobil ("Ostalb Mobile").

Line network

The following lines are planned or had already been established in 2021:

References

S-Bahn in Germany
Rail transport in Baden-Württemberg
Rail transport in Bavaria
2020 establishments in Germany